Ratatouille is a French vegetable dish.

Ratatouille may also refer to:
 Ratatouille (film), a 2007 animated film by Pixar about a rat aspiring to be a chef
 Ratatouille (video game), multiplatform video game tie-in to the film
 Ratatouille: Food Frenzy, Nintendo DS video game tie-in to the film
 Ratatouille: L'Aventure Totalement Toquée de Rémy, a park ride at Disneyland Paris
 Ratatouille the Musical, a crowdsourced 2020 musical